This article deals with topics related to the demographics of the city of Lahore, in Punjab, Pakistan.

Urban demographics
According to the 1998 census, Lahore's population was 6,318,745. Mid-2006 government estimates put the population at somewhere around 10 million, which makes it the second largest city in Pakistan, after Karachi. It is considered to be one of the 30 largest cities of the world.

Religion

Language
Punjabi is the native language of the province and is the most widely spoken language in Lahore. Punjabi is the primary means of communication in both the city and adjoining rural areas. Punjabi has no official status in Lahore and some Punjabi activists have raised demands for recognition of Punjabi.  English has become increasingly popular with educated and younger people due to its official status in government and preferred language status for business. Many Punjabi speakers in Lahore are known as Majha Dialect Of Punjabi. According to the 1998 census, 86.2% or 6,896,000 of the population are Punjabis; 10.2% or 816,000 are Urdu speakers and the Seraikis, at 0.4%, number about 32,000.

Notes

References

Lahore
Lahore
Lahore